Jalan Perusahaan Perai, Federal Route 3112 (formerly Penang State Route P17), is a dual-carriageway federal road in Penang, Malaysia.

At most sections, the Federal Route 3112 was built under the JKR R5 road standard, allowing maximum speed limit of up to 90 km/h.

List of interchanges

References

Highways in Malaysia
Malaysian Federal Roads